In 2010, the Campeonato Brasileiro Série D, the fourth division of the Brazilian League, will be contested for the second time in history. The competition has 40 clubs, four of which will eventually qualify to the Campeonato Brasileiro Série C to be contested in 2011.

Competition format
The 40 teams are divided in ten groups of 4, playing within them in a double round-robin format. The two best ranked in each group at the end of 6 rounds will qualify to the Second Stage, which will be played in home-and-away system. Winners advance to Third Stage along with the three losers with best record in previous stages. The Quarter-Final winners will be promoted to the Série C 2011. As there is no Série E, or Fifth Division, technically there will be no relegation. However, teams who were not promoted will have to re-qualify for Série D 2011 through their respective state leagues.

Participating teams

1 The second best team, Veranópolis withdrew.
2 Both the second best team, Democrata-GV, and the fourth best team, Villa Nova withdrew.
3 All Goiás-based teams withdrew. Since Goiás clubs were already allocated in Group 6, the entries were passed on to Distrito Federal, also on Group 6, and better placed on CBF's Ranking, ahead of Tocantins, also on Group 6.
4 All Roraima-based teams withdrew. Since Roraima clube were already allocated in Group 1, the entry passed on to Pará, better placed on CBF's Ranking.
5 The second best team Corintians de Caicó and the fourth best team Santa Cruz (RN) withdrew.
6 Briefly known as Manaos
7 Santana withdrew.
8 Murici and all the other Alagoas State Championship First Division teams withdrew due to the floodings

Results

First stage

Group 1

Group 2

Group 3

Group 4

Group 5

Group 6

Group 7

Group 8

Group 9

Group 10

Second stage
First leg played on September 4 and 05; Second leg played on September 11 and 12.

|}
Teams in the left column played second match at home.

Third stage
First leg played on September 25 and 26; Second leg played on October 2.

|}
Teams in the left column played second match at home.

Three of the five 3rd stage losers qualify due to their overall record:Qualification After 3rd Stage Matchday 02, October 2

Bracket

(p) won on penalty shootout.
(a) won by away goals rule.

Quarter-finals
First leg played on October 10; Second leg played on October 16 and 17.

|}
Teams in the left column played second match at home.

Semifinals
First leg played on October 23 and 24; Second leg played on October 27 and 30.

|}
Teams in the left column played second match at home.

Finals
All times Brazilian Daylight Saving Time

1 Since América's stadium, SESI, doesn't have the minimum attendance capacity, the game was transferred from Amazonas to Pará

Guarany de Sobral won 5–2 on aggregate.

América (AM) was judged not guilty on November 5 by the STJD, accused of fielding an out-of-contract player in the Quarterfinals against Joinville. If found guilty, the club would have been disqualified from the Série D, losing its promotion, which would then by awarded to Joinville. The Semifinals should be then replayed, this time facing Madureira and Joinville. The club will now be judged again, accused of fielding a suspended player in the Second Leg of the Semifinals against Madureira.On November 12, América (AM) was declared guilty of fielding a suspender player. However, later on the same day, the club achieved to suspend the decision.
Finally, on December 9, the STJD decided to punish América (AM) with the loss of 6 points due to fielding an out-of-contract player. América (AM), that way, loses its promoting, that being awarded to Joinville.

Final standings

Top goalscorers

References

Campeonato Brasileiro Série D seasons
4